Menon may refer to:

People
Menon (subcaste), an honorary title accorded to some members of the Nair community of Kerala, southern India; used as a surname by many holders of the title

Surnamed
Menon (surname), the surname of several people

Given named
 Menon (cookbook author), pseudonym of an unidentified 18th-century French cookbook author
Menon (Phidias), a workman with Phidias
Menon (Trojan), a Trojan soldier in Trojan War
Menon I of Pharsalus, assisted Cimon at Battle of Eion
Menon II of Pharsalus, led troops assisting Athens in the Peloponnesian War
Menon III of Pharsalus or Meno, a Thessalian general and character in Plato's Meno dialogue
Menon IV of Pharsalus (born ?), 4th century Greek general
Menon, 4th century BC Peripatetic writer on medicine: see Anonymus Londinensis
Múnón, also called Mennón, a Trojan chieftain or king mentioned by the twelfth-century Icelandic writer Snorri Sturluson that may refer to Menon, Memnon, or another person.

Other uses
Menon (gastropod), a genus of gastropods within the family Eulimidae
Meno, a dialogue by Plato, is sometimes referred to also as Menon
Menon's caecilian
Menon (weapon) An Italian anti-submarine mortar

See also

 
 Mennon
 Menos (disambiguation)
 Meno (disambiguation)